Hardman may refer to:

Hardman (surname)

Places

United States
Hardman, Oregon, an unincorporated community
Hardman, Gilmer County, West Virginia, an unincorporated community

See also
 Hardman & Co., a stained glass maker
 Hardman Peck, a piano maker
 Hardiman